FA, Fa or fa may refer to:

People 
 Fa of Xia, King of China 1747–1728 BC
 Fa Ngum (1316–1393), founder and ruler of the Lao kingdom of Lan Xang

Places 
 Fa, Aude, a commune of the Aude  in France
 Falmouth Academy, a private college-preparatory school in Falmouth, Massachusetts, USA
 Foxcroft Academy, a private high school in Dover-Foxcroft, Maine, USA
 Friends Academy, a Quaker college preparatory school in Locust Valley, New York, USA
 Fryeburg Academy, a private school in Fryeburg, Maine, USA

Arts and entertainment 
 Fa (musical note), the name for F in fixed-do solfège
 Fa Yuiry, a fictional character in Mobile Suit Zeta Gundam
 Fantasy Advertiser, later shortened to FA, a British comics fanzine
 Firearms (video game), a 1998 Half-Life modification commonly abbreviated as FA

Government, law and politics 
 Fa (philosophy), a Chinese philosophical concept covering law, ethics, and logic
 Falange Auténtica (Authentic Phalanx), a Falangist political party in Spain
 Fisheries Agency, a government agency in Taiwan

Languages and alphabets 
 Fa (letter), the seventeenth letter of the Arabic abjad
 Faʼ language, one of the Bantu languages of Cameroon
 fa, ISO 639-1 code of the Persian language

Math, science, and technology 
 Factor analysis, a statistical method
 Fanconi anemia, a rare genetic disease
 Fatty acid, a carboxylic acid with a long aliphatic chain
 Fayalite, the iron-rich end-member in the olivine solid solution series of minerals
 Femtoampere (fA), an SI unit of electric current equal to 10−15 A
 Fluorescein angiography, a technique for examining the circulation of the retina and choroid of the eye
 Folic acid, one of the B vitamins
 Folinic acid, a medication
 Fractional anisotropy, a value that describes the anisotropy of a diffusion process
 Friedreich's ataxia, an inherited disease that causes progressive damage to the nervous system
 Nikon FA, a 35 mm SLR camera

Military 
 Field artillery
 Focke-Achgelis, a defunct German helicopter manufacturer
 Forschungsamt (Research Office of the Reich Air Ministry), the signals intelligence and cryptanalytic agency of the German Nazi Party
 Frankford Arsenal, a former US Army ammunition plant in Philadelphia, Pennsylvania
 Frontal Aviation (Frontovaya Aviatsiya or "FA"), a branch of the Soviet Air Forces focused on battlefield air defence

Sport 
 The Football Association, the body that regulates football in England
 First ascent, in the sport of climbing and mountaineering; different from first free ascent (or FFA)
 Free agent, a sports person no longer under contract with a club

Transport 
 ALCO FA, an American locomotive made by ALCO
 Toyota FA, a heavy duty truck
 Area forecast, in aviation
 Ferrocarriles Argentinos, Argentine railways
 Safair (IATA airline designator FA), a South African aviation company
 NZR FA Class, aclass of steam locomotive used on New Zealand Railways

Other uses 
 F.A. or Intermediate of Arts, an academic diploma
 Fa (brand), a brand for personal care products
 Fa or Fall (unit), an obsolete Scottish measurement of length
 Fat admirer, a person attracted to overweight women
 Financial adviser, a professional who renders financial services to clients
 Food Addicts in Recovery Anonymous (FA), a program of recovery based on the Twelve Steps of Alcoholics Anonymous

See also
 General Aviation XFA, an experimental aircraft of the U.S. Army
 Sweet F.A., a British slang phrase meaning "nothing at all"